

This is a list of the National Register of Historic Places listings in Atoka County, Oklahoma.

This is intended to be a complete list of the properties on the National Register of Historic Places in Atoka County, Oklahoma, United States. The locations of National Register properties for which the latitude and longitude coordinates are included below, may be seen in a map.

There are 16 properties listed on the National Register in the county.  Another 4 properties were once listed but have since been removed.

Current listings

|}

Former listings

|}

See also

 List of National Historic Landmarks in Oklahoma
 National Register of Historic Places listings in Oklahoma

References

 
Atoka County
Buildings and structures in Atoka County, Oklahoma